Teriya Phounja Magar is a Nepalese dancer based on Mumbai, India. She came into the public spotlight during her performances on the dance competition television series Dance India Dance Li'l Masters which she won on 21 June 2014. She is also the winner of Colors TV dance reality show Jhalak Dikhhla Jaa (season 9) which she won on 21 January 2017.  Teriya is the second daughter born to her parents, and attended St. Lawrence High School in Vashi, Navi Mumbai, India.

On 29 June 2014, Teriya was honored with the title "Lumbini Peace Ambassador" by the Kapilvastu Day Campaign. The award was presented by the Deputy Prime Minister and Minister for Local Development, Prakash Man Singh.

Career 
She was very passionate about the dance since her childhood. She used to participate in a different dance competition. At the age of 7 years, she started to learn dance in Butwal. Teriya usually dances in freestyle and Bollywood dance Form. Apart from that, She is extremely versatile and has won many other dance competitions in Nepal.

Dance India Dance Li'l Masters 

She began her career at the age of 11 as a dancer, she gave an audition in the third season of Zee TV's dance reality series Dance India Dance Li'l Masters, where she was selected and came out as the winner with ₹10 lakh (US$14,000) prize money. The show was judged by Geeta Kapoor, Ahmed Khan and Mudassar Khan. While Mithun Chakraborty was the Grand Master of the show. This was the platform where she got big fame among the peoples in India and Nepal.

Jhalak Dikhhla Jaa (season 9) 

After winning DID Li'l Masters season 3, she participated in the ninth season of Colors TV's celebrity dance reality show Jhalak Dikhhla Jaa. In 8 October episode, 5 WildCard entries were introduced by Farah Khan (who too joined the show as a judge). Teriya got wildcard entry as a young celebrity challenger along with Siddharth Nigam, Spandan Chaturvedi, Gracy Goswami and Swasti Nitya. Eventually, she got eliminated but re-entered as wild card entry again on 26 November 2017. After coming back in the show, she rocked the stage in every episodes and she was also declared as the first contestant to enter the finals. The grand finale was high on great performances and perfect scores, Teriya and her partner Aryan grabbed perfect scores and the maximum audience votes and emerged as the winner of the celebrity dance reality show. 
This show was judged by Karan Johar, Farah Khan, Jacqueline Fernandez and Ganesh Hegde. The finale episode also had actor Hrithik Roshan coming over to promote his film Kaabil, and encouraged the finalists. Teriya took home the winning trophy and cash prize worth Rs. 30 lakhs.

Filmography

Television

Cover Songs

Awards

See also
Nepalese female dancers
List of Nepalese people
Non Resident Nepali

References

External links

Nepalese female dancers
Participants in Indian reality television series
Reality dancing competition winners
Nepalese expatriates in India
Living people
People from Rupandehi District
21st-century Nepalese dancers
Year of birth missing (living people)